Aidan Liu  
born July 1, 2000) is an American professional soccer player who currently plays for Vejle Boldklub.

Career

Youth
Liu played club soccer with local side Sockers FC from 2012, before moving to the academy of Danish side HB Køge in August 2018.

Vejle BK
After a year with Køge, Liu moved to Vejle ahead of their 2019-20 season. In October 2020, Liu moved on loan to Danish 2nd Division side FC Sydvest 05. On March 16, 2021, Liu returned to the United States, joining USL Championship side Indy Eleven on loan for the season. Following the 2021 season, it was announced that Liu's loan had expired with Indy Eleven.

Liu again went out on loan, joining Faeroe Islands side B68 Toftir on February 22, 2022.

References 

2000 births
Living people
American expatriate soccer players
American expatriate sportspeople in Denmark
American people of Chinese descent
American soccer players
Association football defenders
Danish 2nd Division players
Expatriate men's footballers in Denmark
FC Sydvest 05 players
HB Køge players
Indy Eleven players
B68 Toftir players
People from Naperville, Illinois
Soccer players from Illinois
Vejle Boldklub players
USL Championship players